Radamés Salazar Solorio (Jiutepec, Morelos, Mexico 8 March 1974 – Mexico City, 21 February 2021) was a Mexican politician.

Biography
He served as a Senator since 2018. Salazar died from COVID-19 during the COVID-19 pandemic in Mexico, fifteen days short of his 47th birthday.

References

1974 births
2021 deaths
Members of the Senate of the Republic (Mexico)
Deaths from the COVID-19 pandemic in Mexico
People from Jiutepec
Politicians from Morelos
Morena (political party) politicians
21st-century Mexican politicians